Burton is a small village, parish and community in Pembrokeshire, Wales, set on a hill overlooking the River Cleddau with views of the estuary to the south, east and west. The community includes the village of Hill Mountain.

History
In 1844, the population of the parish was 846 and included several scattered settlements to the north.

Worship
The parish church of St Mary's is a grade II* listed building.

There are two places of worship: one for Baptists, and one for Wesleyan Methodists.

Castle
Benton Castle is a Grade II* listed building. It was originally a 13th-century fortification, later falling into ruin, and subsequently stabilised and converted to a dwelling in the 20th century.

Local Government
The village has an elected community council and gives its name to an electoral ward of Pembrokeshire County Council. The electoral ward of Burton covers the community of Rosemarket. Since reorganisation in 1995 the ward has mainly been held by Independent councillors, although it was briefly held by the Conservatives after the 1999 election. The total population of the above ward at the 2011 census was 1826

Amenities

The Beggars Reach hotel and restaurant
The Jolly Sailor waterfront pub on the river

References

External links

Further historical information and sources on GENUKI
Burton War Memorial

Villages in Pembrokeshire
Communities in Pembrokeshire